Lorain County Transit (LCT) is the public transportation provider for Lorain County, Ohio. It is a division of the Lorain County Commissioners, and its offices are in downtown Elyria. Robert Wickens, Board Chairman in the 1970s, successfully led the effort to begin fixed route transit service in the county. The current manager of LCT is Richard Enty

LCT once operated a total of 13 fixed bus routes, the majority of which connected at a transfer point near Midway Mall in Elyria, the county seat. Secondary transfer hubs for the system were in downtown Elyria and Lorain. LCT also operates connecting paratransit service for the three communities of Oberlin, Amherst and Avon.

In addition to servicing the county's various localities, LCT also provided an express route connecting Oberlin to Cleveland Hopkins International Airport (from which one can transfer to the RTA Rapid Transit into Cleveland.) As of June 1, 2009, LCT shut down this route due to funding shortfalls. This route was funded primarily by Oberlin College. Since fall 2005, LCT had provided supplemental service to the airport for the College's vacations and holidays. In spring 2009, this supplemental service was provided on 47-55 passenger motorcoaches owned and operated by Brecksville Road Transit.

LCT also provides an express bus route from Elyria to the Cleveland RTA park and ride lot in Westlake. LCT hopes to extend this route to Downtown Cleveland. On November 27, 2012, LCT added an express route to Downtown Cleveland. As of August 16, 2013 LCT discontinued this route due to low ridership.

Routes

(As of January 18, 2010):  

Downtown Elyria Loop
1 Lorain/Elyria via Washington
2 Lorain/Elyria via Broadway
51 East Elyria/Broad Street Loop 
52 East Elyria/Abbe Road Loop 

The fixed routes currently run every 2 hours.

Defunct routes

Cleveland Commuter Route (Elyria - Downtown Cleveland) (discontinued August 16, 2013)
Elyria - Westlake Park and Ride
Oberlin - Cleveland Hopkins International Airport (discontinued June 5, 2009)

External links
 Lorain County Transit Main Site

Bus transportation in Ohio
County government agencies in Ohio
Transportation in Lorain County, Ohio
Transit agencies in Ohio
Lorain, Ohio